Chémery-les-Deux is a commune in the Moselle department in Grand Est in northeastern France.

Localities of the commune: Hobling (German: Hoblingen), Ingling (German: Inglingen), Klop.

See also
 Communes of the Moselle department

References

External links
 

Communes of Moselle (department)